Ptolemaic is the adjective formed from the name Ptolemy, and may refer to:

Pertaining to the Ptolemaic dynasty
Ptolemaic dynasty, the Macedonian Greek dynasty that ruled Egypt founded in 305 BC by Ptolemy I Soter
Ptolemaic Kingdom

Pertaining to a certain ancient writer 

Relating to Ptolemy, 2nd-century AD geographer and astronomer/astrologer
Ptolemaic system, a geocentric model of the universe developed in detail by the astronomer Claudius Ptolemaeus

See also
 Ptolemy (name)